Edward Francis Hutton (September 7, 1875 – July 11, 1962) was an American financier and co-founder of E. F. Hutton & Co., once one of the largest financial firms in the United States.

Early life
Hutton was born in Manhattan, New York City, the son of James Laws Hutton (1847–1885), who left an Ohio farm to work there. James died on December 14, 1885, at the age of 37 when Hutton was only ten years old, leaving Edward and his two siblings, Grace Hutton (b. 1873) and Franklyn Laws Hutton (1877–1940) to be raised by their mother, Frances Elouise Hulse Hutton (1851–1930). Hutton's younger brother, Franklyn, married Edna Woolworth, the dime store heiress and was the father of Barbara Hutton.

As a schoolboy, Hutton attended the New York Latin School before transferring to P.S. 69. During his adolescence, he worked in a gear factory at age fifteen and then two years later in the mailroom of a securities firm. He completed his studies by taking classes at Trinity Chapel High School and Packer's Business College.

Career

In 1904, Hutton and his brother Franklyn Laws Hutton founded the American stock brokerage firm E. F. Hutton & Co. Under their leadership, it became one of the most respected financial firms in the United States and for several decades was the second largest brokerage firm in the United States.  E.F. Hutton merged in 1988 with Shearson Lehman/American Express.

Personal life
He married his first wife Blanch Horton (December 6, 1878 – December 18, 1917) on October 9, 1900. Blanch was the daughter of investment banker Henry Lawrence Horton. She died in the early days of the 1918 Spanish Flu influenza pandemic. Blanch and Edward had one son:
Halcourt Horton Hutton (1902–1920), who was killed in a horse riding accident on Long Island on September 25, 1920.

He married his second wife, General Foods heiress, Marjorie Merriweather Post, in 1920. During their marriage (1920–1935) they built Mar-a-Lago in Palm Beach, Florida; and also commissioned the largest privately owned seagoing yacht of the era, the Hussar V, which is best known as the Sea Cloud. The Huttons divorced in 1935 after evidence of Hutton's affairs with other women became known to Marjorie. Together they had one child:
Nedenia Marjorie Hutton, an actress known as Dina Merrill, who for years served as the only female director on the board of E. F. Hutton & Co.

In February 1936, at age 60, he married twenty-eight-year-old Dorothy Dear Metzger, who had just divorced her husband, Homer, the previous October. E.F. met Dorothy through Marjorie's daughter Adelaide, who had invited Dorothy and her husband to spend a weekend with her and other friends at Hillwood. Dorothy and Homer P. Metzger had one daughter, who became Edward's stepdaughter upon the marriage:
Nancy Joan Metzger, who inherited a portion of her stepfather's estate when he died.

Hutton died on July 11, 1962, in Old Westbury, New York. He is buried in Locust Valley Cemetery, Locust Valley, New York.

Notable Residences 

 Hillwood, Long Island: Built in 1922 in Brookville, NY after purchasing and demolishing the former Warburton Hall Estate, it was designed in the Tudor style by architect Charles Mansfield Hart. Post would keep it in the divorce and sold it in 1951 to Long Island University which later become LIU Post.
 Hogarcito, Palm Beach, FL: Built in 1921 for Hutton and his second wife, and designed by noted society architect Marion Sims Wyeth. It is noted for its Spanish-style bell tower that rises some three stories above the main house. Post thought the house was too small so commissioned the building of Mar-a-Lago. After Mar-a-Lago was completed it became the home of E.F. Hutton's brother and business partner Franklyn L. Hutton, whose daughter was Woolworth heiress Barbara Hutton.
 Mar-a-Lago, Palm Beach, FL: Built in 1927 with his second wife Marjorie Merriweather Post as a winter residence. Post would end up keeping the house after the divorce.
 Hutfield, Old Westbury, NY: Lived in with his third wife Dorothy Metzger. 1963 Dorothy Metzger Hutton sold their Old Westbury estate to Long Island University. Today Hutfield is the Fine Arts Center at LIU Post.

Yachts 
E.F. Hutton had a passion for yachting and sport fishing and had numerous private yachts built throughout his lifetime. With the exception of Lady Baltimore, he would always named them Hussar:

References

External links
West Palm West Historical Society, Mar-a-Lago
The Sea Cloud

1875 births
1962 deaths
20th-century American businesspeople
American financiers
American stockbrokers
Burials at Locust Valley Cemetery
Businesspeople from New York City
Chairmen of General Mills
Horse-related accidents and incidents
Hutton family
People from Brookville, New York
People from Old Westbury, New York
People from Palm Beach, Florida
Stock and commodity market managers